Monu may refer to:

 Monu Island, island of the Mamanuca Islands, Fiji
 MONU (magazine), an English-language, biannual magazine on urbanism
 Nick Monu (born 1965), Nigerian actor and director
 Ngozi Monu (born 1981), Nigerian swimmer